Madhya Pradesh State Highway 2 (MP SH 2) is a State Highway running from Bhind in Madhya Pradesh till Karauli in Rajasthan via Ater, Morena, Joura and Sabalgarh.

It passes through important tourist spots such as the Fort in Ater in Bhind district.

See Also
List of state highways in Madhya Pradesh

References

State Highways in Madhya Pradesh